École polyvalente Saint-Jérôme (EPSJ) is a public Francophone secondary school in Saint-Jérôme, Quebec. It is a part of the Commission scolaire de la Rivière-du-Nord.

It serves sections of Saint-Jérôme, including Mirabel, Prévost, and Saint-Colomban.

References

External links
 École polyvalente Saint-Jérôme 

Buildings and structures in Saint-Jérôme
High schools in Quebec
Schools in Laurentides